Je with belt, also called Bashkir Je, is an additional letter of the Cyrillic script that was used in the Bashkir alphabet of  in 1912.

Computing codes 
This letter has not been encoded in Unicode yet.

Sources

See also 

 Ј ј - Je
 Bashkir language
 Cyrillic script

Cyrillic letters
Cyrillic letters with diacritics
Unencoded Cyrillic letters